Henry Armand Giroux (born 1943) is an American-Canadian scholar and cultural critic. One of the founding theorists of critical pedagogy in the United States, he is best known for his pioneering work in public pedagogy, cultural studies, youth studies, higher education, media studies, and critical theory. In 2002 Routledge named Giroux as one of the top fifty educational thinkers of the modern period.

A high-school social studies teacher in Barrington, Rhode Island, for six years, Giroux has held positions at Boston University, Miami University, and Pennsylvania State University. In 2004, Giroux began serving as the Global TV Network Chair in Communication at McMaster University in Hamilton, Ontario.

Early life and education
Henry Giroux was born on September 18, 1943, in Providence, Rhode Island, the son of Alice (Waldron) and Armand Giroux. Giroux completed a Master of Arts degree in history at Appalachian State University in 1968. After teaching high-school social studies in Barrington, Rhode Island, for six years, Giroux earned a Doctor of Arts degree in history at Carnegie Mellon University in 1977.

Career
Giroux's first position as a professor was in education at Boston University, which he held for the next six years until he was controversially denied tenure by John Silber, the conservative president of the university. Following that, he became an education professor and scholar in residence at Miami University in Oxford, Ohio. While there he also served as the founding Director of the Center for Education and Cultural Studies.

In 1992, he began a 12-year position in the Waterbury Chair Professorship at Pennsylvania State University, also serving as the Director of the Waterbury Forum in Education and Cultural Studies. In 2004 Giroux became the Global Television Network Chair in Communication at McMaster University in Hamilton, Ontario. In July 2014, he was named to the McMaster University Chair for Scholarship in the Public Interest. He is the Director of the McMaster Centre for Research in the Public Interest. He lives in Hamilton, Ontario, where he currently is a chaired professor for Scholarship in the Public Interest at McMaster University. He is married to Ourania Filippakou.

Accomplishments
Giroux's writing has won many awards, and he has written for a range of public and scholarly sources. He has written more than 70 books; published more than 500 papers; and published hundreds of chapters in others' books, articles in magazines, and more.

While at Miami University, Giroux was named as a Distinguished Scholar. For 1987–1988 he won the Visiting Distinguished Professor Award at the University of Missouri–Kansas City. Between 1992 and 2004, he held the Waterbury Chair Professorship at Penn State University. In 1995, he was awarded the Visiting Asa Knowles Chair Professorship by Northeastern University and he won a Tokyo Metropolitan University Fellowship for Research.

In 1998, Giroux was selected to the Laureate chapter of Kappa Delta Phi. in 1998 and 1999, he was awarded a Distinguished Visiting Lectureship in art education at the School of the Art Institute of Chicago. For May–June 2000 he was the winner of a Getty Research Institute Visiting Scholar Award. In 2001, he was selected as a Hooker Distinguished Visiting Professor at McMaster University.

In 2002 Giroux was named as one of the top fifty educational thinkers of the modern period in Fifty Modern Thinkers on Education: From Piaget to the Present as part of Routledge's "Key Guides Publication Series". In 2001 he won the James L. Kinneavy Award for the most outstanding article published in JAC in 2001, which was presented by the Association of Teachers of Advanced Composition at the Conference on College Composition and Communication held in Chicago in March 2002. For 2002 he was named by Oxford University to deliver the Herbert Spencer Lecture.

For 2003 Giroux was selected as the Barstow Visiting Scholar at Saginaw Valley State University. In 2005, he was awarded an honorary Doctorate of Letters by Memorial University of Newfoundland.

The University in Chains was named by the American Educational Studies Association as the recipient of the AESA Critics' Book Choice Award for 2008. He was named by the Toronto Star in 2012 as one of the top 12 Canadians Changing the Way We Think. Education and the Crisis of Public Values: Challenging the Assault on Teachers, Students, & Public Education was awarded a CHOICE Outstanding Academic Title and has received the Annual O. L. Davis, Jr. Outstanding Book Award from the AATC (American Association for Teaching and Curriculum) and the AESA (American Educational Studies Association) Critics Choice Award 2012.

In 2015 he was awarded an honorary Doctorate of Humane Letters degree from Chapman University in California. He is a winner of a Lifetime Achievement Award granted by the AERA. In 2015 he won two other major awards from Chapman University: the "Changing the World Award" and "The Paulo Freire Democratic Project Social Justice Award." Also during 2015, Giroux was honored with a Distinguished Alumni Award from Appalachian State University. In 2017 he was awarded an honorary doctorate from the University of the West of Scotland. In 2019 he received an AERA Fellows Award and the Association for Education in Journalism and Mass Communication's Professional Freedom and Responsibility Award. In 2021 he received a Doctor Honoris Causa from the Center for Latin American Studies in Education Inclusive (CELEI).

For many years Giroux was co-Editor-in-chief of the Review of Education, Pedagogy and Cultural Studies, published by Taylor and Francis.

Reception 
Giroux's work remains foundational in a range of fields. He is the first to use the phrase critical pedagogy, according to Curry Malott, and helped inaugurate the "critical turn in education". In Leaders in Critical Pedagogy, he is identified as one of the "first wave" of critical pedagogues.

As is typical of foundational scholars, his work has been critiqued on numerous fronts, from feminists like Patti Lather and Elizabeth Ellsworth and race scholars.

Publications
As of 2021 Giroux had published more than 70 books, 200 chapters, and 500 articles and was published widely throughout education and cultural studies literature.

1980s
 1981: Ideology, Culture and the Process of Schooling, Philadelphia, PA: Temple University Press
 1981: Curriculum & Instruction: Alternatives in Education. Berkeley: McCutchan (co-edited with Anthony Penna and William Pinar)
 1983: Theory and Resistance in Education, Westport, CT: Bergin and Garvey Press (Introduction by Paulo Freire)
 1983: The Hidden Curriculum and Moral Education: Deception or Discovery?, Berkeley, CA: McCutchan (co-edited with David E. Purpel)
 1985: Education Under Siege: The Conservative, Liberal, and Radical Debate Over Schooling, Westport, CT: Bergin and Garvey Press(co-authored with Stanley Aronowitz)
 1988: Schooling and the Struggle for Public Life, Minneapolis, MN: University of Minnesota Press
 1988: Teachers as Intellectuals: Toward a Critical Pedagogy of Learning (Introduction by Paulo Freire & Foreword by Peter McLaren). Westport, CT: Bergin and Garvey Press. 
 1989: Popular Culture, Schooling, & Everyday Life. Westport, CT: Bergin & Garvey (co-edited with Roger Simon).
 1989: Critical Pedagogy, The State, and the Struggle for Culture. Albany: State University of New York Press (co-edited with Peter McLaren).

1990s
 1991: Postmodern Education: Politics, Culture, and Social Criticism, Minneapolis, MN: University of Minnesota Press (co-authored with Stanley Aronowitz)
 1992: Border Crossings: Cultural Workers and the Politics of Education, New York: Routledge
 1993: Between Borders: Pedagogy and the Politics of Cultural Studies New York: Routledge (co-edited with Peter McLaren)
 1993: Living Dangerously: Multiculturalism and the Politics of Difference, New York: Peter Lang
 1994: Disturbing Pleasures: Learning Popular Culture, New York: Routledge
 1996: Fugitive Cultures: Race, Violence, and Youth, New York: Routledge
 1996: Counternarratives: Cultural Studies and Critical Pedagogies in Postmodern Spaces, New York: Routledge (co-authored with Peter McLaren, Colin Lankshear, and Mike Cole) 
 1997: Pedagogy and the Politics of Hope: Theory, Culture, and Schooling, A Critical Reader, Boulder, CO: Westview Press
 1998: Channel Surfing: Racism, the Media, and the Destruction of Today's Youth, New York: St. Martin's Press
 1999: The Mouse that Roared: Disney and the End of Innocence, Lanham, MD: Rowman & Littlefield Publishers. 

2000s
 2000: Impure Acts: The Practical Politics of Cultural Studies, New York: Routledge
 2000: Stealing Innocence: Corporate Culture's War on Children, London: Palgrave Macmillan
 2002: Breaking In to the Movies: Film and the Culture of Politics, Malden, MA: Blackwell Publishers
 2002: Public Spaces/Private Lives: Democracy Beyond 9/11, Lanham, MD: Rowman & Littlefield Publishers
 2004: The Abandoned Generation: Democracy Beyond the Culture of Fear, London: Palgrave Macmillan
 2004: Take Back Higher Education, London: Palgrave Macmillan (co-authored with Susan Searls Giroux)
 2004: Terror of Neoliberalism: Authoritarianism and the Eclipse of Democracy, Boulder, CO: Paradigm Publishers
 2005: Against the New Authoritarianism: Politics after Abu Ghraib, Winnipeg, MAN: Arbeiter Ring Publishing / Oakland, CA: AK Press
 2006: Beyond the Spectacle of Terrorism: Global Uncertainty and the Challenge of the New Media, Boulder, CO: Paradigm Publishers
 2006: America on the Edge: Henry Giroux on Politics, Education, and Culture, London: Palgrave Macmillan
 2006: The Giroux Reader, Boulder, CO: Paradigm Publishers (edited by Christopher Robbins)
 2006: Stormy Weather: Katrina and the Politics of Disposability, Boulder, CO: Paradigm Publishers
 2007: The University in Chains: Confronting the Military-Industrial-Academic Complex, Boulder, CO: Paradigm Publishers
 2008: Against the Terror of Neoliberalism: Beyond the Politics of Greed, Boulder, CO: Paradigm Publishers
 2009: Youth in a Suspect Society: Democracy or Disposability?, London: Palgrave Macmillan

2010s
 2010: Politics Beyond Hope: Obama and the Crisis of Youth, Race, and Democracy, (2010) Boulder, CO: Paradigm Publishers
 2010: The Mouse that Roared: Disney and the End of Innocence, 2nd Edition. Lanham, MD: Rowman & Littlefield Publishers (co-authored with Grace Pollock)
 2010: Hearts of Darkness: Torturing Children in the War on Terror, Boulder, CO: Paradigm Publishers
 2011: Zombie Politics in the Age of Casino Capitalism, New York: Peter Lang
 2011: Education and the Public Sphere: Ideas of Radical Pedagogy, Cracow, Poland: Impuls (co-authored with Lech Witkowski) 
 2011: On Critical Pedagogy, New York: Bloomsbury Academic. 
2015: second edition appears, w/ updated 'Introduction' & author Interviews, as Education and the Crisis of Public Values: Challenging the Assault on Teachers, Students, and Public Education. 
 2011: Education and the Crisis of Public Values: Challenging the Assault on Teachers, Students, & Public Education. New York: Peter Lang Publishing, Inc. 
 2012: Disposable Youth: Racialized Memories, and the Culture of Cruelty, New York: Routledge 
 2012: Twilight of the Social: Resurgent Publics in the Age of Disposability, Boulder, CO: Paradigm Publishers
 2013: Youth in Revolt: Reclaiming a Democratic Future, Boulder, CO: Paradigm Publishers
 2013: America's Education Deficit and the War on Youth, New York: Monthly Review Press
 2013: Neoliberalism, Education, Terrorism: Contemporary Dialogues, Boulder, CO: Paradigm Publishers (co-authored with Jeffrey DiLeo, Sophia McClennen, and Kenneth Saltman)
 2013: Public Intellectuals Against the Neoliberal University, philosophersforchange.org link
 2014: Neoliberalism's War on Higher Education, Chicago, IL: Haymarket Books / Toronto, ON: Between the Lines Books.  (Haymarket Books);  (Between the Lines Books)
 2014: The Violence of Organized Forgetting: Thinking Beyond America's Disimagination Machine, City Lights Publishers. 
 2015: Disposable Futures: The Seduction of Violence in the Age of Spectacle, City Lights Publishers.  (co-authored with Brad Evans)
 2015: Dangerous Thinking in the Age of the New Authoritarianism, Routledge Publishers. 
 2016: America's Addiction to Terrorism, Monthly Review Press 
 2017: America at War with Itself, City Lights Publishers. 
 2018: The Public in Peril: Trump and the Menace of American Authoritarianism, Routledge. 
 2018: American Nightmare: The Challenge of U.S. Authoritarianism, City Lights Publishers. 
 2018: "Pedagogia Critica para Tiempos Dificiles," Madrid, Spain: Mapas Colectivos
 2019: The Terror of the Unforeseen, Los Angeles Review of Books
 2019: The New Henry Giroux Reader: The Role of the Public Intellectual in a Time of Tyranny, Myers Education Press 

2020s
 2020: Neoliberalism's War on Higher Education, 2nd ed., Haymarket Books 
 2020: On Critical Pedagogy, 2nd ed., Bloomsbury Academic 
 2021: Race, Politics, and Pandemic Pedagogy: Education in a Time of Crisis, Bloomsbury Academic 
 2022:  "Pedagogy of Resistance: Against Manufactured Ignorance", Bloomsbury Academic

See also
 Stanley Aronowitz
 Joe L. Kincheloe
 Youth empowerment

References

Footnotes

Bibliography

Further reading

External links

 Henry Giroux's Website
 Reading list at The Freechild Project website
 Biographical details
 
 
 "Elaborates on Deep State in parallel article with Jim Palombo's on same subject Ragazine.CC"
 Truthout Interviews Henry A. Giroux on Neoliberalism
 The Scourge of Neoliberalism w/ Henry Giroux (Interview on RT)
 Henry A. Giroux on Trump's Cabinet, the Church of Neoliberal Evangelicals. Truthout. January 2, 2017. (video interview)

1943 births
20th-century American male writers
20th-century American non-fiction writers
20th-century Canadian male writers
20th-century Canadian non-fiction writers
21st-century American male writers
21st-century American non-fiction writers
21st-century Canadian male writers
21st-century Canadian non-fiction writers
American democratic socialists
American educational theorists
American male non-fiction writers
American political writers
Canadian democratic socialists
Canadian educational theorists
Canadian male non-fiction writers
Canadian political writers
Critical pedagogy
Living people
Academic staff of McMaster University
Miami University faculty
Pennsylvania State University faculty
People from Barrington, Rhode Island
Postmodern writers
Rhode Island socialists
Schoolteachers from Rhode Island
Sociologists of education
Writers from Hamilton, Ontario
Writers from Providence, Rhode Island
Youth empowerment people